Aliou Mahamidou (1947–1996) was a Nigerien businessman and politician who served as the Prime Minister of Niger from 2 March 1990 to 1 November 1991.

References 

  

1936 births
1996 deaths
Prime Ministers of Niger